Sabicea pedicellata is a species of plant in the family Rubiaceae. It is found from southern Nigeria to Cameroon. Its natural habitat is subtropical or tropical moist lowland forests. It is threatened by habitat loss.

References

pedicellata
Vulnerable plants
Taxonomy articles created by Polbot
Taxa named by Herbert Fuller Wernham
Taxobox binomials not recognized by IUCN